Benjamin Frazier Taylor (born August 31, 1978) is a former professional American football player.  Taylor was elected to the Virginia Tech Sports Hall of Fame in 2017.  He now teaches physical education and coaches football at Shenandoah University in Virginia.

College career
Taylor was a standout for the Virginia Tech Hokies football team, earning All-America honors in 2000 and 2001. He led the Hokies in tackles his junior and senior seasons with 103 tackles in 2000 and 121 in 2001.

Professional career
Taylor played in a total of 49 NFL games and had 218 tackles in four seasons with the Browns and one for the Green Bay Packers.

Cleveland Browns
Taylor selected by the Browns in the 4th round (111th overall) of the 2002 NFL Draft.  His best year was in 2005 when he was second on the Browns with 113 tackles.

Green Bay Packers
On March 26, 2006, the Packers signed Taylor to a 1-year contract.

College Coaching
After finishing his pro career, Taylor is a wide receivers coach for the Shenandoah University football team.

References

External links
NFL.com player page

1978 births
Living people
People from Bellaire, Ohio
American football linebackers
Virginia Tech Hokies football players
Cleveland Browns players
Green Bay Packers players